"De Cora <3" (also stylized as "De Cora 💙") is a song recorded by Puerto Rican singer Rauw Alejandro and Colombian singer J Balvin for Alejandro's debut studio album, Afrodisíaco (2020). It was written by Alejandro, Caleb Calloway, Colla, Eric Duars, D'Alexis, and Balvin, while the production was handled by Calloway and Alejandro. The song was released for digital download and streaming by Sony Music Latin and Duars Entertainment on November 12, 2020, as the fifth single from the album. A Spanish language romantic urbano song, it expresses the feelings of someone who still misses his ex-partner, wishing her the best.

"De Cora <3" received positive reviews from music critics, who complimented its rhythms and the contrast in the singers' vocals. The track was commercially successful, reaching number one in El Salvador, Honduras, Panama, and Puerto Rico, as well as the top five in Guatemala and Mexico. In Spain and on Billboards Hot Latin Songs in the United States, it peaked in the top 20. The song has received several certifications, including platinum in Spain. An accompanying music video, released simultaneously with the song, was directed by Gustavo "Gus" Camacho. It depicts the singers as two prisoners who go to a work camp, cleaning and trimming trees made of clouds, to make it rain for their beloved. To promote the song, Alejandro and Balvin performed it on The Late Late Show with James Corden.

Background and release
Rauw Alejandro announced that he was working on his debut studio album Afrodisíaco in February 2020. On October 13, 2020, he shared photos of himself along with J Balvin on social media, using the hashtag #Afrodisíaco, confirming that there would be a collaboration between the two singers on the album. On November 9, 2020, Alejandro revealed the album's track list, including his collaboration with Balvin, entitled "De Cora <3", as the sixth track. On November 12, 2020, the song was released for digital download and streaming by Sony Music Latin and Duars Entertainment as the fourth single from Afrodisíaco. During an interview with MTV News, Alejandro talked about the collaboration:

Composition and lyrics

Musically, "De Cora <3" is a Spanish language urbano song, written by Alejandro, Caleb Calloway, Colla, Eric Duars, D'Alexis, and Balvin. Its production was handled by Calloway and Alejandro, and the track runs for a total of 3 minutes and 10 seconds. As Alejandro explains, "De Cora", which translates to "From Heart" in English, is a common phrase in Puerto Rico, when they "really mean something". "<3" represents a "little heart symbol" which used to be popular on SMS messages in the 2000s.

Lyrically, "De Cora <3" is a romantic song about living with a young woman in a beautiful home, expressing the feelings of someone who still misses his partner. It talks about how you can wish your ex-partner the best, even if you are no longer with her. The lyrics include, "Extraño el sabor de tu boca / Extraño saborearte / A tu cuerpo le digo Picasso, porque tu eres arte / Me obligan a pensarte" (I miss the taste of your mouth / I miss tasting you / I call your body Picasso because you are art / They force me to think about you).

Critical reception
Alberto Palao Murcia from Los 40 gave "De Cora <3" a positive review, saying it "invites you to dance at all times thanks to its base". In 2022, Ernesto Lechner from Rolling Stone ranked the track as Alejandro's 13th-best song, stating the he "sounds perfectly" next to Balvin. The critic continued praising "the contrast in their voices" as "spectacular", while describing the song's chorus and pre-chorus as "addictive".

Commercial performance
"De Cora <3" debuted and peaked at number 16 on the US Billboard Hot Latin Songs chart on November 28, 2020, becoming Alejandro's 12th entry and Balvin's 73rd. The song also peaked at numbers 19 and 11 on the Latin Airplay and Latin Rhythm Airplay charts, respectively. In Spain's official weekly chart, the track debuted and peaked at number 18 on November 1, 2020. It was later certified platinum by the Productores de Música de España (PROMUSICAE), for track-equivalent sales of over 40,000 units in the country. Additionally, "De Cora <3" reached number one in El Salvador, Honduras, Panama, and Puerto Rico, as well as the top 10 in Dominican Republic, Guatemala, and Mexico. In Mexico, the song was certified platinum by the Asociación Mexicana de Productores de Fonogramas y Videogramas (AMPROFON), for track-equivalent sales of over 140,000 units.

Promotion

Music video

An accompanying music video was released simultaneously with the song. The visual was filmed in Colombia and directed by Venezuelan director Gustavo "Gus" Camacho, who had also directed the videos for Alejandro's previous singles "Fantasías", "Fantasías (Remix)", "Elegí", "Tattoo (Remix)", "Elegí (Remix)", and "Enchule". It depicts the singers as two prisoners who go to a work camp, cleaning and trimming trees made of clouds, to make it rain for their beloved.

Live performances
Alejandro and Balvin performed the song on The Late Late Show with James Corden on November 23, 2020.

Track listing

Credits and personnel
Credits adapted from Tidal.

 Rauw Alejandro associated performer, composer, lyricist, producer
 J Balvin associated performer, composer, lyricist
 Héctor C. López "Caleb Calloway" composer, lyricist, producer
 José M. Collazo "Colla" composer, lyricist, mastering engineer, mixing engineer
 Eric Pérez Rovira "Eric Duars" composer, lyricist, executive producer
 Angel Ruben Díaz "D'Alexis" composer, lyricist
 Amber Rubi Urena A&R coordinator
 John Eddie Pérez A&R director
 Jorge E. Pizarro "Kenobi" recording engineer

Charts

Weekly charts

Monthly charts

Year-end charts

Certifications

Release history

References

2020 songs
2020 singles
Rauw Alejandro songs
J Balvin songs
Songs written by Rauw Alejandro
Songs written by J Balvin
Sony Music Latin singles
Spanish-language songs